The Women's road race of the 2015 UCI Road World Championships took place in and around Richmond, Virginia, United States on September 26, 2015. Pauline Ferrand-Prévot was the defending champion, having won the world title in 2014.

In a sprint finish of a select group of nine riders, Great Britain's Lizzie Armitstead added the rainbow jersey to her UCI Women's Road World Cup overall victory, out-sprinting Dutch rider Anna van der Breggen by just over a wheel's length. The podium was completed by home rider Megan Guarnier, the first American to podium in the event since 1994.

Qualification

Qualification was based mainly on the 2015 UCI Nation Ranking as of August 15, 2015. The first five nations in this classification qualified seven riders to start, the next ten nations qualified six riders to start and the next five nations qualified five riders to start. Other nations and non ranked nations had the possibility to send three riders to start.

  (7)
  (7)
  (7)
  (7)
  (7)
  (6)
  (6)
  (6)
  (6)
  (6)
  (6)
  (6)
  (6)
  (6)
  (6)
  (5)
  (5)
  (5)
  (5)
  (5)
 Other nations (3)

Moreover, the outgoing World Champion and continental champions were also able to take part in the race on top of the nation numbers.

Course

The women rode eight laps on the road race circuit. All road races took place on a challenging, technical and inner-city road circuit. The circuit headed west from Downtown Richmond, working its way onto Monument Avenue, a paver-lined, historic boulevard that's been named one of the "10 Great Streets in America". Cyclists took a 180-degree turn at the Jefferson Davis monument and then maneuvered through the Uptown district and Virginia Commonwealth University. Halfway through the circuit, the race headed down into Shockoe Bottom before following the canal and passing Great Shiplock Park, the start of the Virginia Capital Trail. A sharp, off-camber turn at Rockets Landing brought the riders to the narrow, twisty, cobbled  climb up to Libby Hill Park in the historic Church Hill neighborhood. A quick descent, followed by three hard turns led to a  climb up 23rd Street. Once atop this steep cobbled hill, riders descended into Shockoe Bottom. This led them to the final  climb on Governor Street. At the top, the riders had to take a sharp left turn onto the false-flat finishing straight,  to the finish.

Schedule
All times are in Eastern Daylight Time (UTC−4).

Participating nations
135 cyclists from 46 nations took part in the women's road race. The numbers of cyclists per nation are shown in parentheses.

Final classification

References

Women's road race
UCI Road World Championships – Women's road race
2015 in women's road cycling